Syedna Mohammad Ezzuddin (died 1539 / 27th Safar, AH 946AH in Zabid -Yemen) was the 23rd Dai of the Dawoodi Bohra, a sub-sect of Isma'ili Shi'i Islam. The Dawoodi Bohra trace their belief system back to Yemen, where it evolved from the Fatimid Caliphate and where they were persecuted due to their differences from mainstream Sunni Islam and Zaydi Islam. Around 1567 CE, the Dawat (the sect's religious organisation) was relocated to Gujarat, India.

Life
He succeeded the 22nd Dai, Ali Shamshuddin, and conferred succession on Yusuf Najmuddin. Muhammad Izzuddin was the 17th Dai from Ale Waleed and the last of Duat Kiram from Yemen. Syedna Mohammed Izzuddin resided in Masaar but had to leave due to the immense atrocities of the Zaidi Imam Al-Mutawakkil Yahya Sharaf ad-Din. He had to submit the fortress of Masaar to the Zaidi Imam after the wafat or demise of Syedi Hasan bin Nuh.

Death
Syedna Muhammad Izzuddin arrived in Zabid with the intention of going to Hajj but the Zaidi followers had poisoned the drinking water in the ship and it had affected Syedna Muhammad Izzuddin. On knowing this he returned to Zabid immediately and died after a few days.

Succession
Syedna Muhammad Izzuddin conferred nass or succession on Yusuf Najmuddin. He prepared three letters, one of which was kept in Yemen and the other two sent to Al Hind in different ships. When Izzuddin sent the nass letters to Al Hind, he was told that he might not be aware of the situation in Al Hind as well as that of Yusuf Najmuddin due to the long distance. Syedna Mohammed Izzuddin replied that “The letter will reach Yusuf Najmuddin and he shall become Da'i al-Mutlaq”, and it did happen.

References

Further reading
 

Tayyibi da'is
Banu al-Walid al-Anf
Year of birth unknown

1539 deaths
16th century in Yemen
16th-century Arabs
16th-century Ismailis
16th-century Islamic religious leaders